Eddie Brill is an American comedian, writer, and actor who started his career in Boston, Massachusetts. He was previously the warm-up comedian and comedy talent coordinator of Late Show with David Letterman. Brill tours frequently, performing in the US as well as England, Ireland, France, Australia, Amsterdam, and Hong Kong. At one time, he was a humor consultant for Reader's Digest.

Biography
Eddie Brill was born in New York City, and raised in Hollywood, Florida.

Eddie Brill attended Emerson College, where he founded the Emerson Comedy Workshop along with Denis Leary, Chris Phillips and Adam Roth. He helped to create the first comedy writing department in a college, along with fellow alumni Norman Lear in 1978.  He also began performing standup while in college.  He stopped after college in 1980 and then picked it back up in July 1984 when he started a comedy club in NYC named The Paper Moon.  Brill has been working internationally as a comedian since 1989 and has appeared on over 100 TV shows in six countries. He also worked for the Late Show with David Letterman from February 1997 through February 2014 as the audience warm-up and in March 2001 also became the talent coordinator for the stand-up comedians. 
He is also the creative director of The Great American Comedy Festival in Norfolk, Nebraska which honors Johnny Carson.

In 2012, Brill was removed from his position as the stand-up comedy booker for The Late Show for giving an interview with The New York Times without the show's permission. He was quoted as saying “There are a lot less female comics who are authentic. I see a lot of female comics who, to please an audience, will act like men."

References

External links
Eddie's Official Website

American male comedians
21st-century American comedians
Emerson College alumni
Living people
Writers from Boston
Year of birth missing (living people)